Przegonia - is a Polish coat of arms. It was used by several szlachta families in the times of the Polish–Lithuanian Commonwealth.

History

Przegonia origin from Ostoja coat of arms

Blazon

Notable bearers

External links 
  Przegonia Coat of Arms, variant, bearers

See also
 Polish heraldry
 Heraldry
 Coat of arms
 Ostoja Coat of Arms
 Dynastic Genealogy
 Ornatowski.com
 Ulanowski, Bolesław  "Starodawne prawa polskiego pomniki",  t.7, Kraków 1885

Przegonia